New Jersey v. T. L. O., 469 U.S. 325 (1985), is a landmark decision by the Supreme Court of the United States which established the standards by which a public school official can search a student in a school environment without a search warrant, and to what extent.

The case centered around a student at Piscataway High School in Middlesex County, New Jersey, known then only by her initials T. L. O., who was searched for contraband after she was caught smoking in a school bathroom. She was sent to the principal's office, where the vice principal searched her purse and found marijuana, drug paraphernalia, and documentation of drug sales. She was expelled from the school and charged by police for the paraphernalia found in the search, but fought the charges on the basis that the search of her purse violated the Fourth Amendment's prohibition against unreasonable search and seizure.

The New Jersey Superior Court affirmed the constitutionality of the search, but the Supreme Court of New Jersey reversed, holding that the search of her purse was unreasonable. On appeal to the U.S. Supreme Court, the Court held that the Fourth Amendment applies to searches conducted by school officials in a school setting. However, school officials do not need to have probable cause nor obtain a warrant before searching a student. Instead, in order for a search to be justified, school officials must have "reasonable suspicion" that the student has violated either the law or school rules. In a 6–3 decision delivered by Justice Byron White, the Court ruled that the school's search of T. L. O.'s purse was constitutional, setting a new precedent for school searches and student privacy.

Background
On March 7, 1980, a teacher at Piscataway High School in Piscataway, New Jersey discovered two 14-year-old freshmen smoking in the girl's bathroom, in violation of school rules. While students were permitted to smoke in designated smoking areas, the bathroom was not one of them. The two were sent to principal's office, where they were questioned by vice principal Theodore Choplick. One of the students admitted to smoking and was assigned to complete a three-day smoking clinic before being sent back to class. The other student, whose initials were T. L. O., denied ever having smoked in her life.

Choplick brought T. L. O. into his private office and demanded to see her purse. Upon searching it, Choplick found a pack of Marlboro cigarettes and rolling paper in plain view. These findings prompted Choplick to conduct a more thorough search of T. L. O.'s purse, revealing a small amount of marijuana, a tobacco pipe, an index card with the names of students who owed her money, and two letters linking her to dealing marijuana. Choplick notified the police and T. L. O.'s mother, who both arrived at the school shortly after. A police officer requested for T. L. O. to be brought to the police station for questioning, and T. L. O.'s mother drove her from the school to the police station. During questioning, T. L. O. admitted to selling marijuana on school property.

She was convicted of dealing and use of illicit drugs. She was expelled from the school and fined $1,000. She was charged as a juvenile for the drugs and paraphernalia found in the search.

Opinion of the Court
Oral arguments were initially heard on March 28, 1984. The Supreme Court of the United States, in a 6–3 decision issued by Justice White, balancing between the legitimate expectation of privacy of the individual, even a child, and the school's interest in maintaining order and discipline, held for the appellant (the state). According to school officials, they do require a "reasonable suspicion" to perform a search.

Her possession of any cigarettes was relevant to whether or not she was being truthful, and since she had been caught in the bathroom and taken directly to the office, it was reasonable to assume she had the cigarettes in her purse. Thus, the vice-principal had reasonable cause to suspect a school rule had been broken, and more than just a "hunch" to search the purse. When the vice-principal was searching for the cigarettes, the drug-related evidence was in plain view. Plain view is an exception to the warrant requirement of the Fourth Amendment. Thus, the reasonable search for cigarettes led to some of the drug related material being discovered, which justified a search (including the zippered compartments inside the bag) resulting in the discovery of the cigarettes and other evidence including a small bag of marijuana and cigarette rolling papers.

Other opinions 
In a separate concurring opinion, Justice Lewis F. Powell Jr. (joined by Justice Sandra Day O'Connor) stated that while he agreed with the Court's opinion, he felt that students in primary and secondary educational settings should not be afforded the same level of protection for search and seizures as adults and juveniles in non-school settings.

Justice William J. Brennan, joined by Justice Thurgood Marshall, agreed with the majority's conclusions about the applicability of the Fourth Amendment to school teachers but dissented from the new standard set down by the Court, which he felt was a departure from the traditional "probable cause" approach. 

Brennan went on to argue that for the government to justify a warrantless search, some "special governmental interest" outside of standard law enforcement interests was required. This idea was later adopted by the Court as the special needs doctrine.

See also
 List of United States Supreme Court cases, volume 469
 Vernonia School District 47J v. Acton, 515 U.S. 649 (1995)
 Board of Education v. Earls, 536 U.S. 822 (2002)
 Safford Unified School District v. Redding, 557 U.S. 364 (2009)
 Special needs exception
 Terry v. Ohio, 392 U.S. 1 (1968)
Cohen v. California, 403 U.S. 15 (1971)

Footnotes

References

 References

 Sources
 
 
 New Jersey v. T. L. O., 469 U.S. 325 (1985)

External links
 
 Summary on LandmarkCases.org

United States Supreme Court cases
United States Supreme Court cases of the Burger Court
United States Fourth Amendment case law
Student rights case law in the United States
United States controlled substances case law
1985 in United States case law
1985 in education
Piscataway, New Jersey
Cannabis in New Jersey
Education in Middlesex County, New Jersey
Smoking in the United States